Santo Antônio do Caiuá is a municipality in the northwestern part of the state of Paraná, Brazil. The population is 2,626 (2020 est.) in an area of 219.07 km². The municipality was founded in 1961.

References

External links
http://www.citybrazil.com.br/sp/stoantoniocaiua/ (in Portuguese)

Municipalities in Paraná